The Southern Miss Lady Eagles women's basketball team represents the University of Southern Mississippi in women's basketball. The school competes in the Sun Belt Conference in Division I of the National Collegiate Athletic Association (NCAA). The Lady Eagles play home basketball games at Reed Green Coliseum in Hattiesburg, Mississippi.

History
As of the end of the 2015–16 season, the Lady Eagles have a 722–536 all-time record.

NCAA tournament results

References

External links